Samuel Joseph Melville (born Samuel Joseph Grossman, 1934 – September 13, 1971), was the principal conspirator and bomb setter in the 1969 bombings of eight government and commercial office buildings in New York City. Melville cited his opposition to the Vietnam War and U.S. imperialism as the motivation for the bombings.  He pleaded guilty to conspiracy and to bombing the Federal Office Building in lower Manhattan, as well as to assaulting a marshal in a failed escape attempt. A key figure in the 1971 Attica Prison riots, he was shot and killed when the uprising was put down by force.

Early life
Sam Melville (a name borrowed from author Herman Melville) was born to Dorothy and William Grossman in 1934 in New York City.  Dorothy left William and moved with Sam back to her hometown of Tonawanda, New York, a suburb of Buffalo.  Melville lost sight in one eye at a young age because of a flying cinder.  He claimed to have had a rough childhood because of his mother's series of alcoholic and abusive boyfriends.  He left home and moved to Buffalo as a teenager, making his living as a bowling alley pinsetter.

Melville later met his father, who had come to Western New York to look for him.  His father convinced him to move back to New York City, finish his high school education and pursue his passion for singing. Back in New York, Melville completed high school, studied singing, found employment as a draftsman, married and started a family.

Politics
Melville enjoyed his job but hated the company he worked for.  When he was ordered to work on a project for Chase Manhattan Bank designing new offices in the then apartheid based Union of South Africa, Melville became outraged and quit his job.  This contributed to a rift and eventual estrangement from his wife and child.

Melville survived on odd jobs, including working for The National Guardian, a leftist weekly newspaper published in New York City.  He joined various groups in opposition to the Vietnam War, became familiar with social issues, and met many radical activists.  Melville became interested in the story of George Metesky, who had terrorized the city with 37 bombings of theaters, terminals, libraries and offices between 1940 and 1956 and was then in a state mental hospital. Melville began writing "George Metesky Was Here" on buildings around the city.

Bombings
Melville was responsible for, or connected to, at least the following bombings, all of them in 1969.  The majority were preceded by telephone calls warning building security personnel and featured simultaneous political communiques to the press.  Although most explosions were timed for late-night hours, the bombing of the Marine Midland Building resulted in 19 injuries.

 Jul. 27, Grace Pier, owned by United Fruit Company
 Aug. 20, Marine Midland Building
 Sep. 19, Federal Office Building on Federal Plaza, offices of the Department of Commerce and the Army Inspector General
 Oct. 7, Army Induction Center on Whitehall Street
 Nov. 11, Standard Oil offices in the RCA Building
 Nov. 11, Chase Manhattan Bank headquarters offices
 Nov. 11, General Motors Building
 Nov. 12, New York City Criminal Courts Building on Center Street, where the Panther 21 trial was being held.

Accomplices
Melville had met and become romantically involved with Jane Alpert, a recent graduate from Swarthmore College, while she was enrolled in a graduate program in journalism at Columbia University.  The pair were also close with Pat Swinton and Dave Hughey who assisted them with several bombings.  Other members of their group were never identified.  Melville and Alpert became increasingly involved with the Weather Underground and the Black Panther Party.

Arrest and charges
In New York City, Melville had been working with a well known radical activist group known as "The Crazies".  One of their members, George Demmerle, was an FBI informant who assisted in the gathering of evidence and apprehension of the group. On November 12, 1969, hours after the Criminal Courts Building bombing, police arrested Melville and Demmerle as they placed dynamite charges in National Guard trucks parked outside the 69th Regimental Armory at 26th Street and Lexington Avenue.  Alpert and Hughey were arrested shortly thereafter.

Escape attempt
On March 7, 1970, Melville overpowered an unarmed marshal at the Federal Courthouse and tried to escape.  During a conference with his attorney on a Saturday, when the building was almost deserted, he jumped the marshal, knocked him down and tied him up with his own belt before running out of the room and down a stairway.  Melville was recaptured by an armed marshal on a landing two floors below.

Imprisonment and death at Attica

Melville was eventually transferred to Attica Prison, in Western New York. There, he began an underground publication, Iced Pig, and began to organize the prison population to fight for better conditions. While imprisoned, he researched the economics of prison jobs and wrote a mini-treatise criticizing prison labor, "Anatomy of the Laundry", which was widely read by inmates.

Melville was among the committee of inmates who helped organize inmates' demands and keep order during the Attica Prison Riot in September 1971. Melville, 28 other inmates, and 10 hostages were shot and killed by state police on September 13, when the uprising was put down by order of Governor Nelson Rockefeller. According to some witnesses, Melville was alive after the initial assault was over and the prison was secure but was shot to death by law enforcement while trying to surrender. The law enforcement officer who shot Melville claimed he had done so because Melville was armed with explosives, but investigators and prosecutors could find no evidence to support this claim and lawyers for surviving prisoners maintained that he was "murdered in cold blood with his hands in the air in surrender".

Legacy

A book was published with the letters he wrote from prison, Letters From Attica, with a foreword by William Kunstler, and additional contributions by Jane Alpert and John Cohen.

On the basis of the text of a letter he wrote on May 16, 1971, Frederic Rzewski wrote a musical composition, .  The text used is

On August 28, 2000, a federal judge awarded $8 million to the survivors of the Attica uprising. The son of Sam Melville, Josh Melville, was awarded $25,000, and said he planned to establish an educational fund with the money awarded.

References

Further reading
Leslie James Pickering.  Mad Bomber Melville.   (paperback). 2007; Portland, Oregon: Arissa Media Group, 2007.  .

1934 births
1971 deaths
Activists from New York (state)
American male criminals
American people who died in prison custody
Bombers (people)
Deaths by firearm in New York (state)
Prisoners who died in New York (state) detention
Members of the Weather Underground
People from Tonawanda, New York
Serial bombers